The 1967 Togolese coup d'état was a bloodless military coup that occurred in the West African country of Togo on 13 January 1967. The leader of the coup, Lieutenant Colonel Étienne Eyadéma (later General Gnassingbé Eyadéma) ousted Togo's second President, Nicolas Grunitzky, whom he essentially brought to power following the 1963 coup d'état. 

Following the coup, political parties were banned, and all constitutional processes were suspended. Colonel Kléber Dadjo was named interim President of Togo (as Chairman of the National Reconciliation Committee), a position that he held until 14 April 1967, when Eyadéma assumed the presidency. 

Eyadéma went on to rule the country until his death on 5 February 2005.

References

Notes

Bibliography

1967 Coup
Military coups in Togo
Togo coup
Coup
January 1967 events in Africa
1960s coups d'état and coup attempts